"Taken for a Fool" is a song by American rock-band The Strokes, mostly written by guitarist Nick Valensi. It is the second single for their fourth studio album, Angles, and was released as a 7" vinyl and digital download on July 1, 2011.

Track listing

Music video
The music video for the song was released worldwide on July 8, 2011. The video was directed by Laurent Briet.

Charts

References

External links

The Strokes songs
2011 singles
Songs written by Julian Casablancas
2010 songs
Rough Trade Records singles
Songs written by Fabrizio Moretti
Songs written by Nick Valensi